ISO 3166-2:GM is the entry for the Gambia in ISO 3166-2, part of the ISO 3166 standard published by the International Organization for Standardization (ISO), which defines codes for the names of the principal subdivisions (e.g., provinces or states) of all countries coded in ISO 3166-1.

Currently for the Gambia, ISO 3166-2 codes are defined for 1 city and 5 divisions. The city Banjul is the capital of the country and has special status equal to the divisions.

Each code consists of two parts, separated by a hyphen. The second part is a letter. The code for Central River is from its former name, MacCarthy Island.

Current codes
Subdivision names are listed as in the ISO 3166-2 standard published by the ISO 3166 Maintenance Agency (ISO 3166/MA).

Click on the button in the header to sort each column.

Changes
The following changes to the entry are listed on ISO's online catalogue, the Online Browsing Platform:

See also
 Subdivisions of the Gambia
 FIPS region codes of the Gambia

External links
 ISO Online Browsing Platform: GM
 Divisions of Gambia, Statoids.com

2:GM
ISO 3166-2
Gambia geography-related lists